Alfred, Marquis de Moges (1830-1861 in Menton, Alpes-Maritimes) was a French diplomat of the 19th century. In 1858 he accompanied Charles de Chassiron and Jean-Baptiste Louis Gros to sign the Treaty of Amity and Commerce between France and Japan in Edo on 9 October 1858.

Works

Notes

References
 Medzini, Meron French Policy in Japan Harvard University Press 1971,

External links
 

19th-century French diplomats
1830 births
1861 deaths